Sequoyah's Cabin is a log cabin and historic site off Oklahoma State Highway 101 near Akins, Oklahoma.  It was the home between 1829 and 1844 of the Cherokee Indian Sequoyah (also known as George Gist, c. 1765–1844), who in 1821 created a written language for the Cherokee Nation.  The cabin and surrounding park was declared a National Historic Landmark in 1965 and is now owned by the Cherokee Nation.

Description
Sequoyah's Cabin is located east of Akin on the east side of State Highway 101 at a point where it makes a northward jog. The cabin is now sheltered from the elements by a brick structure built in the 1930s. There is a bronze statue of Sequoyah outside. The house is maintained as a historic house museum and is furnished to appear as it might have when Sequoyah lived there. There are relics and documents associated with his life.

History
Sequoyah was born sometime in the 1760s to a Cherokee mother and a white or half-breed father, on the ancestral lands of the Cherokee in the southeastern United States.  Unschooled except in tribal ways and customs, he came to understand the value of writing, especially in dealing with adjacent British settlers.  In 1809 he began to work on a writing system for the Cherokee language.  The result of his work, the Cherokee syllabary, continues to be used today.  In the 1820s he moved west, to instruct western Cherokees in the writing system.  It is during this period that this cabin was built, in 1829.

The cabin was acquired by the Oklahoma Historical Society in 1936. The shelter over the building was built by the Works Progress Administration in 1936, and is surrounded by a  park.

The cabin and surrounding park, now owned by the Cherokee Nation, was declared a National Historic Landmark in 1965. And, as for all other already-designated National Historic Landmarks, it was automatically listed on the new National Register of Historic Places on October 15, 1966.

In 2016, the Cherokee Nation purchased the cabin and its property for $100,000.

See also
List of National Historic Landmarks in Oklahoma
National Register of Historic Places listings in Sequoyah County, Oklahoma

References

External links
Sequoyah's Cabin Museum, Cherokee Nation
Sequoyah's Cabin State Park (archived from the original on January 26, 2010)
National Park Service article on Sequoyah's Cabin
"Sequoyah's Cabin Historic Site - Sallisaw, Oklahoma", Explore Southern History. Photos.

Biographical museums in Oklahoma
Cherokee Nation buildings and structures
Cherokee Nation (1794–1907)
Historic house museums in Oklahoma
Houses completed in 1829
Houses in Sequoyah County, Oklahoma
Houses on the National Register of Historic Places in Oklahoma
Museums in Sequoyah County, Oklahoma
National Historic Landmarks in Oklahoma
National Register of Historic Places in Sequoyah County, Oklahoma
Native American museums in Oklahoma
Oklahoma Historical Society
Works Progress Administration in Oklahoma